The White Pearl may refer to:
The White Pearl (1915 film)
The White Pearl (novel)
A (sailing yacht)